Sri Lanka Sikhamani Sunna Deniya Gunadasa (5 September 1931 – 6 July 2014) (known as S. D. Gunadasa or Dasa Mudalali) was a Sri Lankan business magnate who brought the concept of the supermarket to Sri Lanka in 1977.  He later became a garment manufacturer in Sri Lanka, and subsequently the Chairman and founder of DASA Group.

Early childhood

Gunadasa was born in the village of Talalla Gandara in Matara, the youngest of the three sons. In his early years, Gundasa was educated at a local village school in Gandara. Influenced by his mother's organising and delegation skills, he became an entrepreneur.

Career

Gunadasa began his business career as a street hawker in Colombo, selling shirts, vests, and other clothing items. Some days, he would carry his products into the city in a basket on his head. On successful days, he would treat himself to a biriyani dinner as a reward.

As his enterprise grew, he was able to purchase his own premises. Later, he opened Sri Lanka's first supermarket and department store, a new type of store for the country at the time. Gunadasa focused on employee benefits, an area that other employers often overlooked. He provided free lodging and, reportedly, a barber for employees' convenience.

Gundasa later turned to garment manufacturing. He produced clothing under the brand name Duro, which was accepted by international markets in the United States and Europe.

Honours

Gunadasa was honored with the National Award of Sri Lanka Sikhamani by the government of the Democratic Socialist Republic of Sri Lanka in 1985.

Death

Gunadasa died on 6 July 2014 at the age of 83 due to natural causes. His remains are located at the Borella General Cemetery in Colombo, Sri Lanka.

References

 
 
 

1931 births
2014 deaths
Sri Lankan Buddhists
Sinhalese businesspeople
Sri Lankan philanthropists
Sri Lanka Sikhamani
20th-century philanthropists